The 1967 Navy Midshipmen football team represented the United States Naval Academy (USNA) as an independent during the 1967 NCAA University Division football season. The team was led by third-year head coach Bill Elias.

Schedule

Personnel

References

Navy
Navy Midshipmen football seasons
Navy Midshipmen football